Pilosocereus curtisii is a species of Pilosocereus found in the Lesser Antilles and the British Virgin Islands.

References

External links

curtisii